Tampines is an urban planning area and new town located in the eastern part of Singapore.

The term may be used to associate different things with the town:

Tampines MRT station, a mass rapid transit station serving the town
Tampines Mall, a shopping mall near the MRT station
Tampines 1, another shopping mall near the MRT station
Tampines Rovers FC, a football club playing in the S-League
Tampines Primary School, a primary school located in Tampines
Tampines North Primary School, another primary school located within the town
Tampines Secondary School, a secondary school located within Tampines
Sungei Tampines, a river flowing through the area